Pixelberry Studios is a mobile game development company based in Mountain View, California, United States. Founded in 2013 by Oliver Miao, Keith Emnett, and Winston She, Pixelberry aims to create "games with heart," beginning with Surviving High School and Cause of Death, which deals with themes of bullying, eating disorders and capturing serial killers. Since then, the company has fully released three more mobile games: Hollywood U, High School Story and Choices: Stories You Play. In November 2017, Pixelberry was acquired by Nexon.

References

External links
Official website

Companies based in Mountain View, California
Video game development companies
Video game companies of the United States
Nexon
Video game companies established in 2013
2017 mergers and acquisitions
American subsidiaries of foreign companies